Microsoft v. TomTom, Inc. was a court case brought by Microsoft against TomTom in 2009. According to Microsoft, TomTom was violating Microsoft's software patents on the FAT32 file system.

TomTom's navigation products use the Linux kernel, and according to Microsoft, TomTom violated two patents related to legacy compatibility features in the FAT32 file system. On 19 March TomTom filed a countersuit alleging Microsoft is infringing three of its patents. TomTom accused Microsoft’s Streets and Trips products of infringing four patents in TomTom’s vehicle navigation software.

According to Microsoft, the reason for accusing TomTom of patent infringement was that other companies that utilize Microsoft patents have bought licenses from Microsoft.

Microsoft issued the following statement:

On March 2009, TomTom settled the patent dispute by purchasing licenses from Microsoft to use the FAT32 file system. TomTom has joined the Open Invention Network, an intellectual property sharing organization for innovators using Linux.

References

United States patent case law
2009 in United States case law
Microsoft litigation
Law articles needing an infobox